Maroot Dokmalipar is a professional footballer from Thailand. He currently plays for Rajnavy Rayong in the Thailand Premier League.

References

External links
Thai Premier League Profile

Living people
Maroot Dokmalipar
1983 births
Association football midfielders
Maroot Dokmalipar